The following outline is provided as an overview of and topical guide to Lithuania:

Lithuania – sovereign country located in the Baltic region of Northern Europe. Situated along the south-eastern shore of the Baltic Sea, sharing borders with Latvia to the north, Belarus to the southeast, Poland, and the Russian exclave of the Kaliningrad Oblast to the southwest. Lithuania is a member of NATO, OECD and of the European Union. Its population is about 2.8 million. The largest city and capital is Vilnius.

During the 14th century, Lithuania was the largest country in Europe, as present-day Belarus, Ukraine, and parts of Poland and Russia were territories of the Grand Duchy of Lithuania. With the Lublin Union of 1569 Poland and Lithuania formed a new state: the Polish–Lithuanian Commonwealth, which was finally destroyed by its neighboring countries in 1795. Most of Lithuania's territory was annexed by the Russian Empire, until the Act of Independence was signed on 16 February 1918, which declared re-establishment of a sovereign state. Between 1940 and 1945 Lithuania was occupied by both the Soviet Union and Nazi Germany at different times. When World War II was near its end in 1944 and the Nazis retreated, the Soviet Union reoccupied Lithuania. On 11 March 1990, Lithuania became the first Baltic republic to declare its restored independence after 50 years of Soviet occupation.
Lithuania became a full member of the Schengen Agreement on 21 December 2007. In 2009, Lithuania celebrated the millennium of its name.

General reference 

 Pronunciation:  
 Common English country name:  Lithuania
 Official English country name:  The Republic of Lithuania
 Common endonym:    Lietuva
 Official endonym:    Lietuvos Respublika
 Adjectival(s):  Lithuanian
 Demonym(s):  Lithuanians
 Etymology:  Name of Lithuania
 International rankings of Lithuania
 ISO country codes:  LT, LTU, 440
 ISO region codes:  See ISO 3166-2:LT
 Internet country code top-level domain:  .lt

Geography of Lithuania 

Geography of Lithuania
 Lithuania is: a country
 Location:
 Northern Hemisphere and Eastern Hemisphere
 Eurasia
 Europe
 Northern Europe
 Eastern Europe
 Time zone:  Eastern European Time (UTC+02), Eastern European Summer Time (UTC+03)
 Extreme points of Lithuania
 High:  Aukštojas Hill 
 Low:  Nemunas delta 
 Land boundaries:  1,574 km
 680 km
 576 km
 227 km
 91 km
 Coastline:  Baltic Sea 90 km
 Population of Lithuania: 3,361,100 (1 April 2008)  – 130th most populous country

 Area of Lithuania: 65,200 km2
 Atlas of Lithuania

Environment of Lithuania 

Environment of Lithuania
 Climate of Lithuania
 Environmental issues in Lithuania
 Renewable energy in Lithuania
 Geology of Lithuania
 Protected areas of Lithuania
 Biosphere reserves in Lithuania
 National parks of Lithuania
 Wildlife of Lithuania
 Flora of Lithuania
 Fauna of Lithuania
 Birds of Lithuania
 Mammals of Lithuania

Natural geographic features of Lithuania 

 Lakes of Lithuania
 Rivers of Lithuania
 World Heritage Sites in Lithuania

Regions of Lithuania 

Regions of Lithuania

Ecoregions of Lithuania 

List of ecoregions in Lithuania
 Ecoregions in Lithuania

Administrative divisions of Lithuania 

Administrative divisions of Lithuania
 Counties of Lithuania
 Municipalities of Lithuania
 Elderships of Lithuania

Counties of Lithuania 

Counties of Lithuania

Municipalities of Lithuania 

Municipalities of Lithuania
 Capital of Lithuania: Vilnius
 Cities of Lithuania

Elderships of Lithuania 

Elderships of Lithuania

Demography of Lithuania 

Demographics of Lithuania

Government and politics of Lithuania 

Politics of Lithuania
 Form of government: unitary semi-presidential representative democratic republic
 Capital city of Lithuania: Vilnius
 Elections in Lithuania
 Political parties in Lithuania
 Taxation in Lithuania

Branches of the government of Lithuania 

Government of the Republic of Lithuania

Executive branch of the government of Lithuania 
 Head of state: President of Lithuania (Executive), Gitanas Nausėda
 Head of government: Prime Minister of Lithuania, Ingrida Šimonytė
 Cabinet of Lithuania

Legislative branch of the government of Lithuania 
 Seimas: Speaker, Viktorija Čmilytė-Nielsen

Judicial branch of the government of Lithuania 

Court system of Lithuania
 Supreme Court of Lithuania
 Constitutional Court of Lithuania

Foreign relations of Lithuania 

Foreign relations of Lithuania
 Diplomatic missions in Lithuania
 Diplomatic missions of Lithuania

International organization membership 
The Republic of Lithuania is a member of:

Australia Group
Baltic Assembly (BA)
Bank for International Settlements (BIS)
Council of Europe (CE)
Council of the Baltic Sea States (CBSS)
Euro-Atlantic Partnership Council (EAPC)
European Bank for Reconstruction and Development (EBRD)
European Investment Bank (EIB)
European Union (EU)
Food and Agriculture Organization (FAO)
International Atomic Energy Agency (IAEA)
International Bank for Reconstruction and Development (IBRD)
International Chamber of Commerce (ICC)
International Civil Aviation Organization (ICAO)
International Criminal Court (ICCt)
International Criminal Police Organization (Interpol)
International Development Association (IDA)
International Federation of Red Cross and Red Crescent Societies (IFRCS)
International Finance Corporation (IFC)
International Labour Organization (ILO)
International Maritime Organization (IMO)
International Monetary Fund (IMF)
International Olympic Committee (IOC)
International Organization for Migration (IOM)
International Organization for Standardization (ISO)
International Red Cross and Red Crescent Movement (ICRM)
International Telecommunication Union (ITU)

International Trade Union Confederation (ITUC)
Inter-Parliamentary Union (IPU)
Multilateral Investment Guarantee Agency (MIGA)
Nordic Investment Bank (NIB)
North Atlantic Treaty Organization (NATO)
Nuclear Suppliers Group (NSG)
Organisation internationale de la Francophonie (OIF) (observer)
Organisation for Economic Co-operation and Development (OECD)
Organization for Security and Co-operation in Europe (OSCE)
Organisation for the Prohibition of Chemical Weapons (OPCW)
Permanent Court of Arbitration (PCA)
Schengen Agreement
United Nations (UN)
United Nations Conference on Trade and Development (UNCTAD)
UNESCO
United Nations Industrial Development Organization (UNIDO)
United Nations Observer Mission in Georgia (UNOMIG)
Universal Postal Union (UPU)
Western European Union (WEU) (associate partner)
World Confederation of Labour (WCL)
World Customs Organization (WCO)
World Federation of Trade Unions (WFTU)
World Health Organization (WHO)
World Intellectual Property Organization (WIPO)
World Meteorological Organization (WMO)
World Tourism Organization (UNWTO)
World Trade Organization (WTO)

Law and order in Lithuania 

Law of Lithuania
 Constitution of Lithuania
 Crime in Lithuania
 Human rights in Lithuania
 LGBT rights in Lithuania
 Freedom of religion in Lithuania
 Law enforcement in Lithuania
Financial Crime Investigation Service
Special Investigation Service
Lithuanian State Border Guard Service

Military of Lithuania 

Lithuanian Armed Forces
 Command
 President of Lithuania, the commander-in-chief
 Ministry of Defense
 Chief of Defence
 Defence Staff
 Forces
 Lithuanian Land Forces
 Lithuanian Naval Force
 Lithuanian Air Force
 Lithuanian Special Operations Force
 Lithuanian National Defence Volunteer Forces
 Military history of Lithuania
 Military ranks of Lithuania

Local government in Lithuania 

Local government in Lithuania

History of Lithuania 

History of Lithuania
Timeline of the history of Lithuania
Current events of Lithuania
 Economic history of Lithuania
 Military history of Lithuania

Culture of Lithuania 

Culture of Lithuania
 Architecture of Lithuania
Gothic architecture in Lithuania
 Cuisine of Lithuania
 Ethnic minorities in Lithuania
 Festivals in Lithuania
 Languages of Lithuania
 Media in Lithuania
 Museums in Lithuania
 National symbols of Lithuania
 Coat of arms of Lithuania
 Flag of Lithuania
 National anthem of Lithuania
 People of Lithuania
 Public holidays in Lithuania
 Records of Lithuania
 Religion in Lithuania
 Buddhism in Lithuania
 Christianity in Lithuania
 Hinduism in Lithuania
 Islam in Lithuania
 Judaism in Lithuania
 Sikhism in Lithuania
 World Heritage Sites in Lithuania

Art in Lithuania 
 Art in Lithuania
 Cinema of Lithuania
 Literature of Lithuania
 Music of Lithuania
 Television in Lithuania
 Theatre in Lithuania

Sports in Lithuania 

Sports in Lithuania
 Basketball in Lithuania
 Football in Lithuania
 Lithuania at the Olympics

Economy and infrastructure of Lithuania 

Economy of Lithuania
 Economic rank, by nominal GDP (2007): 74th (seventy-fourth)
 Agriculture in Lithuania
 Banking in Lithuania
 National Bank of Lithuania
 Communications in Lithuania
 Internet in Lithuania
 Companies of Lithuania
Currency of Lithuania: Euro
ISO 4217: EUR
 Economic history of Lithuania
 Energy in Lithuania
 Energy policy of Lithuania
 Oil industry in Lithuania
 Health care in Lithuania
 Mining in Lithuania
 Lithuania Stock Exchange
 Tourism in Lithuania
 Transport in Lithuania
 Airports in Lithuania
 Rail transport in Lithuania
 Roads in Lithuania

Education in Lithuania 

Education in Lithuania

See also 

Lithuania
Index of Lithuania-related articles
List of international rankings
List of Lithuania-related topics
Member state of the European Union
Member state of the North Atlantic Treaty Organization
Member state of the United Nations
Outline of Europe
Outline of geography

References

External links 

 Prezidentas (in Lithuanian) — Official presidential site
 Seimas (in Lithuanian) — Official parliamentary site
 Vyriausybė (in Lithuanian and English) — Official governmental site
 Statistics – Official site of Department of Statistics
 
 Lithuania Pages — Sights, history, a picture gallery and a lot of links.
 Lithuania Online — Wide collection of Lithuanian links
 www.travel.lt – The Official Lithuanian Travel Guide
 Lithuanian State Department of Tourism
 Lietuva.lt (in english) – Information about Lithuania
 Information about Lithuania
 Aerial photos of Lithuania by Marius Jovaiša

 Maps and GIS
 Maps of Lithuania on Maps.lt
 Maps of Lithuania on Mapquest

Lithuania